The Santa Clara Unified School District is a school district in Silicon Valley, serving three cities in Santa Clara County, California: Santa Clara, Sunnyvale, and San Jose. Santa Clara USD operates sixteen elementary schools (K-5), three middle schools (6-8, unless otherwise noted), four high schools (9-12), one Adult education program, and one K-12 school, teaching 14,451 students. The district is very diverse, with Hispanics, Caucasians, and Asians having an almost equal representation.

Schools

Note: Based on 2002-2003 school year data
In recent years, SCUSD has also added Gateway School, an intervention program for grades 9 & 10, and for students who either are not prepared for the comprehensive high school or have had tremendous academic difficulty in getting to 9th grade.

SCUSD also has a dual enrollment program at Mission College called Mission Middle College Program.  This is an alternative educational program that is based upon the dual enrollment model of 50% community college enrollment and 50% high school enrollment.  Students self-select and apply to the program and then are enrolled in their junior year.  This program is almost invisible in the district as there is uneven levels of administrative support despite the program's college acceptance and attendance results.

Teacher housing
In 2002 the district opened Casa del Maestro ("House of the Teacher" in Spanish), housing for employees. A second phase opened in 2009.

Transportation

Santa Clara Unified School District consists of the following bus fleet; the amounts are unknown

Gen 3 Blue Bird All American RE (to be phased out soon)
Gen 4 Blue Bird All American RE (A3)
Gen 2 Thomas Saf-T-Liner HDX
Gen 2 Thomas Saf-T-Liner WestCoast-ER 
Gen 2 Blue Bird TC/2000 RE (to be phased out)
Gen 5 Blue Bird All American RE (D3)
Gen 6 Blue Bird All American RE (T3) Diesel
Gen 6 Blue Bird All American RE (T3) Electric (more on the way)

Historical fleet
Crown Supercoach
Gen 2 Blue Bird All American RE

References

External links
 

School districts in Santa Clara County, California
Education in Santa Clara, California
Education in Sunnyvale, California